Lamé is a lunar impact crater located astride the northeast rim of the crater Langrenus, to the east of Mare Fecunditatis. The eastern crater rim appears overlaid by a series of overlapping craters that form an intermittent chain flowing nearly a hundred kilometers to the south. The crater rim protrudes only slightly above the surrounding terrain, but it has a significant rampart where the rim lies within Vendelinus. In the middle of the floor is a slight ridge, forming a central peak.

On some older maps this crater was called Smith. It was previously designated Vendelinus C before being renamed by the IAU.

Satellite craters
By convention these features are identified on lunar maps by placing the letter on the side of the crater midpoint that is closest to Lamé.

References

 
 
 
 
 
 
 
 
 
 
 
 

Impact craters on the Moon